The 25th Men's European Volleyball Championship was the first continental volleyball competition hosted by Russia. Championship took place from September 6 to September 16, 2007, and was won by Spain.

Qualification

Teams

Pool A – Saint Petersburg

Pool B – Moscow

Pool C – Saint Petersburg

Pool D – Moscow

Squads

First round

Pool A
Yubileyny Sports Palace, Saint Petersburg

Pool B
Sport Complex Olympiski, Moscow

Pool C
Yubileyny Sports Palace, Saint Petersburg

Pool D
Sport Complex Olympiski, Moscow

Second round

Pool E
Yubileyny Sports Palace, Saint Petersburg

Pool F
Sport Complex Olympiski, Moscow

Semifinals and finals

Semifinals

Finals

Ranking and statistics

Final ranking

Team roster
Rafael Pascual, Ibán Pérez, José Luis Lobato, Manuel Sevillano, Guillermo Hernán, Miguel Ángel Falasca, Javier Subiela, Guillermo Falasca, José Luis Moltó,   Julián García-Torres, Enrique de la Fuente, Israel Rodríguez.Head coach: Andrea Anastasi.

Individual awards
MVP: 
Best Scorer: 
Best Spiker: 
Best Blocker: 
Best Server: 
Best Libero: 
Best Setter:

References
 European Volleyball Championship 2007 Official website

Men's European Volleyball Championships
European Championship
Volleyball
Volleyball
European Volleyball Championship
2007 in Russian sport
September 2007 sports events in Europe
Men's European Volleyball Championship
Men's European Volleyball Championship